The Old New York Evening Post Building is the former office and printing plant of the New York Evening Post newspaper located at 20 Vesey Street between Church Street and Broadway in the Financial District of Manhattan, New York City. It was built in 1906-07 and was designed by architect Robert D. Kohn for Oswald Garrison Villard, who owned the Post at the time, and is considered to be "one of the few outstanding Art nouveau buildings" ever constructed in the United States.

The fourteen-story, stone-veneer building is "reminiscent of the buildings that line the boulevards of Paris", and was not copied from an existing building. It features three tall bays of cast-iron framed bow windows, separated by pale  limestone piers.  There is an elaborate copper-covered mansard roof, two stories high and four elaborate sculpted figures.  The statues depict the Four Periods of Publicity;  two are by Gutzon Borglum, sculptor of Mount Rushmore, and two by the architect's wife, Estelle Rumbold Kohn.  The New York Evening Post occupied the building until moving to the New York Evening Post Building in 1926.

The building, which was later called the Garrison Building, was designated a New York City landmark in 1965, and was added to the National Register of Historic Places in 1977. The New York Landmarks Preservation Commission was headquartered in the building from 1980 to 1987.

See also
List of New York City Landmarks
National Register of Historic Places listings in New York County, New York

References
Notes

External links

Cast-iron architecture in New York City
Office buildings on the National Register of Historic Places in Manhattan
Office buildings completed in 1907
Art Nouveau architecture in New York City
Art Nouveau commercial buildings
Newspaper headquarters in the United States
Financial District, Manhattan
1907 establishments in New York City
New York City Designated Landmarks in Manhattan
New York Post
Buildings with mansard roofs